The South Street Seaport is a historic area in the New York City borough of Manhattan, centered where Fulton Street meets the East River, and adjacent to the Financial District, in Lower Manhattan. The Seaport is a designated historic district, and is distinct from the neighboring Financial District. It is part of Manhattan Community Board 1 in Lower Manhattan, and is bounded by the Financial District to the west, southwest, and north; the East River to the southeast; and the Two Bridges neighborhood to the northeast.

The neighborhood features some of the oldest architecture in downtown Manhattan, and includes the largest concentration of restored early 19th-century commercial buildings in the city. This includes renovated original mercantile buildings, renovated sailing ships, the former Fulton Fish Market, and modern tourist malls featuring food, shopping, and nightlife.

History

As port
The first pier in the area appeared in 1625, when the Dutch West India Company founded an outpost there. With the influx of the first settlers, the area was quickly developed. One of the first and busiest streets in the area was today's  Pearl Street, so named for a variety of coastal pearl shells. Due to its location, Pearl Street quickly gained popularity among traders. The East River was eventually narrowed. By the second half of the 17th century, the pier was extended to Water Street, then to Front Street, and by the beginning of the 19th century, to  South Street. The pier was well reputed, as it was protected from the westerly winds and ice of the Hudson River.

In 1728, the Schermerhorn Family established trade with the city of Charleston, South Carolina. Subsequently, rice and  indigo came from Charleston. At the time, the port was also the focal point of delivery of goods from England. In 1776, during the American Revolutionary War, the British occupied the port, adversely affecting port trade for eight years. In 1783, many traders returned to England, and most port enterprises collapsed. The port quickly recovered from the post-war crisis. From 1797 until the middle of 19th century, New York had the country's largest system of maritime trade. From 1815 to 1860 the port was called the Port of New York.

On February 22, 1784, the Empress of China sailed from the port to Guangzhou and returned to Philadelphia on May 15, 1785, bringing along, in its cargo,  green and black teas, porcelain, and other goods. This operation marked the beginning of trade relations between the newly formed United States and the Qing Empire.

On January 5, 1818, the 424-ton transatlantic packet James Monroe sailed from Liverpool, opening the first regular trans-Atlantic voyage route, the Black Ball Line. Shipping on this route continued until 1878. Commercially successful transatlantic traffic has led to the creation of many competing companies, including the Red Star Line in 1822. Transportation significantly contributed to the establishment New York as one of the centers of world trade.

One of the largest companies in the South Street Seaport area was the Fulton Fish Market, opened in 1822. The Tin Building opened within the market in 1907; it is one of two remaining structures from the market and the only one that is officially designated as a landmark. In 2005, the market moved to Hunts Point, Bronx.

In November 1825, the Erie Canal, located upstate, was opened. The canal, connecting New York to the western United States, facilitated the economic development of the city. However, for this reason, along with the beginning of the shipping era, there was a need to lengthen the piers and deepen the port.

On the night of December 17, 1835, a large fire in New York City destroyed 17 blocks, and many buildings in the South Street Seaport burned to the ground. Nevertheless, by the 1840s, the port recovered, and by 1850, it reached its heyday:

At its peak, the port hosted many commercial enterprises, institutions, ship-chandlers, workshops, boarding houses, saloons, and brothels. However, by the 1880s, the port began to be depleted of resources, space for the development of these businesses was diminishing, and the port became too shallow for newer ships. By the 1930s, most of the piers no longer functioned, and cargo ships docked mainly on ports on the West Side and in Hoboken. By the late 1950s, the old Ward Line docks, comprising Piers 15, 16, and part of 17, were mostly vacant.

As museum

The South Street Seaport Museum was founded in 1967 by Peter and Norma Stanford. When originally opened as a museum, the focus of the Seaport Museum conservation was to be an educational historic site, with shops mostly operating as reproductions of working environments found during the Seaport's heyday.

In 1982, redevelopment began to turn the museum into a greater tourist attraction via development of modern shopping areas. According to Kenneth Schuman, New York City Commissioner for Economic Development, “It would allow New Yorkers to rediscover the long-obliterated, but historic, link between the city and its waterfront.” The project was undertaken by the prominent developer James Rouse, and was modeled on the concept of a "festival marketplace," a leading revitalization strategy throughout the 1970s. On the other side of Fulton Street from Schermerhorn Row, the main Fulton Fish Market building, which had become a large plain garage-type structure, was rebuilt as an upscale shopping mall.  Pier 17's old platforms were demolished and a new glass shopping pavilion raised in its place, which opened in August 1984.

The original intent of the Seaport development was the preservation of the block of buildings known as Schermerhorn Row on the southwest side of Fulton Street, which were threatened with neglect or future development, at a time when the history of New York City's sailing ship industry was not valued, except by some antiquarians. Early historic preservation efforts focused on these buildings and the acquisition of several sailing ships.  Almost all buildings and the entire Seaport neighborhood are meant to transport the visitor back in time to New York's mid-19th century, to demonstrate what life in the commercial maritime trade was like. Docked at the Seaport are a few historical sailing vessels, including the Wavertree. A section of nearby Fulton Street is preserved as cobblestone and lined with shops, bars, and restaurants. The Bridge Cafe, which claims to be "The Oldest Drinking Establishment in New York" is in a building that formerly housed a brothel.

In late October 2012, Hurricane Sandy heavily damaged the Seaport. Many of the businesses closed, and the remaining businesses suffered from a severe drop in business after the storm. The South Street Seaport Museum re-opened in December 2012. The Howard Hughes Corporation, announced that it would tear down the Seaport's most prominent shopping area, Pier 17, as part of a broader redevelopment of the neighborhood. The new pier contains retail, restaurants, and a rooftop performance venue. It reopened in July 2018.

Constituent parts

Ownership and management of Pier 17
Pier 17 is currently owned and managed by Howard Hughes Corporation. Formerly, it was run by General Growth Properties, which acquired Pier 17's longtime owner, The Rouse Company, in 2004. As part of its restructuring, General Growth spun off the Howard Hughes Corporation.

Historic South Street Seaport neighborhood

Peck Slip, which occupies the area between present-day Water and South streets, served as an active docking place for boats until 1810, and even served as a temporary hideout for George Washington and his troops in April 1776 when they fled from the Battle of Long Island. Then, in 1838, the first steam-powered vessel to make a transatlantic voyage, the S.S.  Great Western, docked in Peck’s Slip to the cheers of a quickly growing crowd of onlookers. Today, the center "island" of the street serves as an open space for the community with Brooklyn Bridge views, often displaying public art installations and gatherings, such as fairs and concerts. Peck Slip is also home to the neighborhood's K-5 elementary school The Peck Slip School, P.S. 343. In 2018, plans were revealed for the redevelopment of the parking lot at 250 Water Street, across from the school.

Museum
Designated by Congress in 1998 as one of several museums which together make up "America's National Maritime Museum", South Street Seaport Museum sits in a 12 square-block historic district that is the site of the original port of New York City. It houses exhibition galleries, a working 19th-century print shop, an archeology museum, a maritime library, a craft center, a marine life conservation lab, and the largest privately owned fleet of historic ships in the country.

Ships in the port
The museum has five vessels docked permanently or semi-permanently, four of which have formal historical status.

Legend:
  – Designated National Historic Landmark and on the National Register of Historic Places
  – On the National Register of Historic Places

The Pioneer and W. O. Decker operate during favorable weather.

Shopping mall and tourist attraction

At the Seaport, a mall and tourism center is built on Pier 17 on the East River.   It was reconstructed in the 2010s and reopened in June 2018.  Decks outside on pier 15 allow views of the East River, Brooklyn Bridge, and Brooklyn Heights. The Paris Cafe, within the South Street Seaport historic area, is claimed to be one of the oldest bars in New York City.

At the entrance to the Seaport is the Titanic Memorial lighthouse.

ESPN studios
Sports broadcaster ESPN opened a radio and television studio at Pier 17 in April 2018, covering .

Transportation

South Street Seaport is served by the  New York City Bus routes.

New York Water Taxi directly serves South Street Seaport on Fridays, weekends, and holidays during the summer, while other New York Water Taxi, NYC Ferry, and SeaStreak ferries serve the nearby ferry slip at Pier 11/Wall Street daily.

The Fulton Street/Fulton Center station complex is the closest New York City Subway station. A new subway station, provisionally called Seaport, has been proposed as part of the unfunded Phase 4 of the Second Avenue Subway. Although this station will be located only 3 blocks from the Fulton Street station, there are no plans for a free transfer between them.

In popular culture

Films
The film Pickup on South Street (1953)  starring Richard Widmark, Jean Peters and Thelma Ritter was set in the neighborhood. Ritter received an Academy Award nomination for the role. 
A Thousand Clowns (1965), starring Jason Robards, was filmed at 19 Fulton Street.
Alvy Singer (Woody Allen) and Annie (Diane Keaton) had a pivotal scene while standing by a Pier 16 railing in Annie Hall (1977).
In the film Working Girl (1988), Tess McGill (Melanie Griffith) accidentally meets an investment banker (Harrison Ford) in a bar in the South Street Seaport.
Scenes from the film Home Alone 2: Lost in New York (1992)  were filmed on South Street at Beekman Street.
In Godzilla (1998), it is the site where the titular kaiju (monster) first came ashore from East River, strewing fish everywhere.
It is seen in the final shot of the film Gangs of New York (2002).
Fulton Street was used in scenes from the movie Hitch (2005), starring Will Smith.
The seaport is a crucial location in the film I Am Legend (2007), in which Will Smith's character broadcasts that he will be there each day at noon, to meet any fellow survivors of a virus outbreak.
Many areas of the surrounding neighborhood was also used as a location in the film The Adjustment Bureau (2011)

Games
 In the video game Crysis 2 (2011), Pier 17 is featured as a multi-player map.
 South Street Seaport makes an appearance in Grand Theft Auto IV renamed Fishmarket South.

Music
 The original Sub Pop version of Nirvana's "In Bloom" video was filmed here in 1990. The video features Kurt, Krist, and Chad clowning around inside the South Street Mall as well as on Wall Street. 
 The venue is home to the Seaport Music Festival each summer.

Television
The  Kojak episode, "Sister Maria" (1977), was filmed in the Seaport.
Anthony Bourdain filmed a segment for his show A Cook's Tour, episode 5: Season 2 "Elements of a Great Bar" (2003), was filmed at Jeremy's Ale House on Front Street in the South Street Seaport.
Scenes from the turn of the century Cinemax television drama series The Knick has filmed scenes on historic Front Street.

Gallery

See also
 East River Esplanade
 List of maritime museums in the United States
 List of museum ships

References

Bibliography

Further reading

External links

 Seaport District
 South Street Seaport Museum
 The Old Seaport Alliance
 Interactive Map of the Seaport – Seaport Cultural Association
 City of Albany: North Waterfront Redevelopment Strategy
 A digital history of South Street Seaport by Fordham University students
 Video profile of the historic Fulton Ferry Hotel at South Street Seaport
 Image gallery
 

 
1967 establishments in New York City
New York City Designated Landmarks in Manhattan
Shopping malls in New York City
Historic districts on the National Register of Historic Places in Manhattan
New York City designated historic districts
Historic American Engineering Record in New York City
Redeveloped ports and waterfronts in the United States
Brookfield Properties
Ports and harbors of New York (state)
Pedestrian malls in the United States
Museums established in 1967
Financial District, Manhattan
Neighborhoods in Manhattan
Museums in Manhattan
Maritime museums in New York (state)
History museums in New York City
Transportation museums in New York City
Water transportation on the National Register of Historic Places